Evangelical Church of Christ (German United Evangelical Church) is a historic church at 701 Fifth Street in Portsmouth, Ohio.

It was built in 1886 and added to the National Register in 1987.

On January 11, 2020, strong winds knocked over the church's steeple causing damage to its roof.

References

Churches in Portsmouth, Ohio
Churches on the National Register of Historic Places in Ohio
Churches completed in 1886
National Register of Historic Places in Scioto County, Ohio
German-American culture in Ohio
Portsmouth, Ohio